Clay Huffman (1957–2001) was a multi-medium artist, most well known for his vibrant, multicolored serigraphs of local roadside architecture.

Early life
A native born Washingtonian, having grown up in Wheaton, MD and graduated from Wheaton High School, Clay Huffman experienced early artistic success as a ceramist. By the age of seventeen, and spurred by a desire to expand his creative repertoire, Clay became a student and artist-in-residence at the original Torpedo Factory Art Center  (his workspace was where they had once stored documents from the Nuremberg Trials). During this same period, he attended the Montgomery College School of Architecture,  an experience which would dramatically affect his future artistic direction and technique. Turning his newly acquired drafting skills towards silkscreen printing, Clay spent the next three years studying the art from nationally recognized masters of the craft, Marcel  and Anne Laddon.

Awards
The union of his experience, talent, and unique subject matter provided Clay with a series of national awards and honors beginning throughout the United States including the Athenaeum  13th Annual Juried Show, the North Carolina Sixth Printing and Drawing Exhibition, and the 27th Hunterdon National Print Exhibition.  Some highlights of this period came in 1993, when one of his silkscreens was selected for display at the prestigious Coconut Grove Arts Festival.  Clay's reputation has since reached international levels with his work now displayed in corporate offices, private collections, and art institutions around the world. Most recently, four of Clay's major works were purchased for the American Embassy in Beijing, China. Clay also sent three major works to the US Embassy in Nairobi. Clay's silkscreen prints have earned unanimous praise from respected art critics and collectors across the country.

Continuing his artistic development in the creative environment of the Torpedo Factory Art Center,  Clay drew his serigraph inspirations from a variety of sources ranging from the instantly recognizable icons of fast-food franchises to fast-disappearing islands of small business and local gossip. With a penchant for elevating the seemingly mundane to the monumental, Clay often focused—literally and figuratively—on "those places we pass each day and take little notice of".

Prior to commencement of any silkscreen project, the artist may make several photo trips to a prospective location in an attempt to capture the essence and mood of a place from various perspectives and times of day. A unique personal relationship develops between artist and cityscape, and it is this subjective insight that Clay so successfully translated and conveyed through his work.

Creating Silkscreens
The actual process of creating a silkscreen includes many steps. Since Clay's work was generally of actual places and things (with the occasional exception of some imaginative additions such as a Cinderellaesque figure running to catch the last train in his print titled "Metropolitan Curfew"), his first step was to take photographic images of the subject at different times to catch it with different shadows, lighting and character. Clay then selected one of these photographs and, wanting to influence the final print, created a line drawing of it. From the line drawing, Clay had to decide what color went where and cut out individual stencils for each area and color choice. Each stencil was then applied to a silkscreen and one by one, ink forced through the screen onto the paper, eventually creating the finished piece. This individual silkscreen process was used for every color on every print.

Unlike images created using a printing press (which uses pressure applied to copper plates to create an impression which can deteriorate in quality from the first print to the last), a silkscreen has no deterioration of the screen during printing. This consistency in print quality throughout the edition means that lower numbered prints should not be more desirable than higher numbered prints, except when determined by the artist.

Clay Huffman kept the first 10 prints of each of his silkscreens, he called it his "pension plan". As the prints sold, the first ten would become increasingly valuable. He sold one of his ten originals of a Krispy Kreme doughnut shop for $750. The original price was $150. Another silkscreen artist with a similar, yet almost opposite, business plan is Zachary Kent of Kent Designs.  Kent currently specializes in rock art (collectible pieces commemorating an event, concert or show). After creating a new piece, Kent auctions the first handful (usually numbers 1–5) on eBay , starting with the higher number and selling through to number one in the edition before offering the rest for sale.

Not content with merely being a serigraph historian, Clay set in motion a developmental process combining his life's work and experience including his study of ceramics, architecture, stained glass, neon fabrication and design. His fascination with three-dimensional imaging can be seen in his whimsical and possibly prophetic piece, "Man's Best Friend in 2084".
This piece, nicknamed "Robot" with an image of the same, was printed in four versions; black, gold, silver & copper.  It was completed in September 1984 and printed on 26"x34" paper.

Imbued with a sense of humor, a touch of nostalgia, and an eye to the future, Clay's work was noted overall by a fastidious attention to detail and masterful technique. Each edition (rarely exceeding 200 impressions) would take Clay up to three months to complete.

Mission
One of his missions as an artist, he maintained, was preservation of disappearing styles of architecture and the giving of new life to bright and colorful signs that increasingly tend to be limited and dulled by modern building regulations and code restrictions. The buildings and objects shown in his silkscreens, he said, were "beautiful at one point. Now they're places we don't even notice. Once they knock them down, we miss them".

Clay Huffman died on January 15, 2001, at his home in Alexandria, VA, of complications related to AIDS and kidney failure. He had known that he was HIV positive for about 15 years before his death but maintained an ambitious work schedule. He was an organizer of the annual Torpedo Factory Mardi-Gras fund raising ball and had an interest in model railroad trains. After his death, remaining pieces of his work were handled by the Executor of his Estate, mentor and friend, Marcel  who also had a studio at the Torpedo Factory Arts Center in Alexandria, VA but has since also passed away. After his death, a small, one week memorial exhibition and sale was held at the Torpedo Factory's Target Gallery.

Clay Huffman's work has been compared to that of fellow Washingtonian, Joseph Craig English.  One of Clay's most recognizable pieces "Pigmentation on Powhatan" (nicknamed "Dixie II" or "Dixie Pig"), can be seen at ClayHuffman.com. His work "Last Call" can be seen at Sunforged Studios.  Unfortunately, online representations of his pieces are rare although his popularity with collectors has grown in recent years.

Portfolio 
The pieces below can be found at ClayHuffman.com

References 

American printers
American artists
1957 births
2001 deaths